Willie Nelson (born April 20, 1987) is an American professional boxer. He held the NABF light middleweight title from 2012 to 2013.

Amateur career
Nelson as an amateur won a gold medal at the 2005 Tammer Tournament. Willie is a 2x National Amateur Gold Medalist. Willie had over 200 Amateur Victories, and many other awards through his amateur career.

Professional career
On June 19, 2010 Nelson knocked out title contender Jesse Feliciano.

On June 11, 2016, Nelson lost to Demetrius Andrade in the 12th round.

References

http://ringnews24.com/index.php/boxing-news/73969-willie-nelson-predicts-a-big-2013-as-he-prepares-to-challenge-mexicos-medina.html#axzz2LFOywqEo
Boxrec.com

External links

1987 births
Living people
Boxers from Cleveland
American male boxers
Light-middleweight boxers